Tobi 23 - Coptic Calendar - Tobi 25 

The twenty-fourth day of the Coptic month of Tobi, the fifth month of the Coptic year. On a common year, this day corresponds to January 19, of the Julian Calendar, and February 1, of the Gregorian Calendar. This day falls in the Coptic Season of Shemu, the season of the Harvest.

Commemorations

Saints 

 The martyrdom of Saint Bisada the Priest 
 The departure of Saint Mary the Ascetic, the Recluse

References 

Days of the Coptic calendar